The South European Pipeline (also known as Lavera–Karlsruhe pipeline) is a crude oil pipeline system in France, Switzerland, and Germany.  It is built and operated by Société du pipeline sud-européen.  The system supplies crude oil to refineries in Feyzin, Cressier, Reichstett, and Karlsruhe.

Technical description
The main   pipeline starts in Fos-sur-Mer (Lavera) in France and runs through Strasbourg to Karlsruhe in Germany.  It became operational in 1962–1963.  As of 2011 it is inactive as the Fos–Strasbourg section is mothballed. Another   pipeline runs from Fos to Strasbourg (Oberhoffen-sur-Moder), and   pipeline runs from Fos to Lyon (Feyzin).  These pipelines became operational in 1971–1972.  The system uses Twelve pumping stations. The maximum discharge of the system is 35 million metric tons per year, although the real used annual amount is approximately 23 million metric tons per year.

Accidents
In August 2009, a breach in the pipeline led to crude oil spilling into Réserve naturelle nationale des Coussouls de Crau, a nature reserve in France.

See also

Transalpine Pipeline

References 

Infrastructure completed in 1962
Oil pipelines in Germany
Oil pipelines in France
Oil pipelines in Switzerland
TotalEnergies
ExxonMobil buildings and structures
BP buildings and structures
Shell plc
ConocoPhillips
BASF
France–Germany relations
France–Switzerland relations
Germany–Switzerland relations